The 1921 Isle of Man Tourist Trophy Junior 350 cc race took place on Tuesday 14 June and the Senior 500 cc was on Thursday 16 June.

In this year AJS redeemed themselves by completing a hat trick, taking the first four places for a total of six of the top ten places in the Junior 350 cc race. Works teams boosted the entries to 133 riders and machines and amongst the thousands of spectators was Stanley Woods, making his first visit to the island as a young man, who would later return to make TT history by winning 10 times.

It had been suggested that sidecar racing could start in 1921 but this idea was not well received and not implemented until 1923. It was announced there was a possibility of moving the TT races to Belgium for 1922 but the Auto-Cycle Union never made the switch.

Despite AJS motorcycles filling the first five places of the Junior race, it was punctures that decided the race outcome. Time lost by Howard Davies mending a puncture at Windy Corner gave the lead to Jim Whalley riding a Massey-Arran motorcycle. On the last lap Whalley also punctured at Windy Corner and finished the Junior race in fifth place. New Imperial made sales-boosting news with a win in the Lightweight 250 cc class by rider Doug Prentice, coming tenth overall in the 350 cc Junior race.

Race results

Junior TT 350cc
Held on Tuesday, June 14, at 9:30 am over a distance of 188.75  miles (5 laps of 37.75 miles each), limited to machines of cylinder capacity not exceeding 350cc., with a class for 250 cc. engines run concurrently for The Motor Cycle cup. All 65 entries started the race (43 in 350cc class, 22 in 250cc class), comprising 33 four-stroke singles, 22 two-stroke singles, 7 Flat Twins and 3 V Twin, thirty-eight finished (25 in 350cc class, 13 in 250cc class).

Senior TT
Held on Thursday, June 16, at 9:30 am over a distance of 226.50  miles (6 laps of 37.75 miles each), limited to machines of cylinder capacity not exceeding 500cc. Out of 68 entries, comprising 52 four-stroke singles, 9 four-stroke twins, 6 two-stroke twins and 1 two-stroke single, sixty-four started the race and twenty-four finished.

References

External links
Detailed race results
Isle of Man TT winners

1921 in British motorsport
1921
Isle
Isle of Man TT